Wanni Arachchige Karunasena (born 07 August 1928) was a Ceylonese politician. He was the member of Parliament of Sri Lanka from Pelmadulla representing the Sri Lanka Freedom Party from 1960 to 1967.

References

Members of the 4th Parliament of Ceylon
Members of the 5th Parliament of Ceylon
Members of the 6th Parliament of Ceylon
Sri Lanka Freedom Party politicians
Sinhalese politicians
1928 births

Date of death missing
Year of death missing